Tinik Ng Teatro (also known as TNT-Adamson) is the oldest student based theater company in Adamson University, Manila, Philippines.

Description
Tinik Ng Teatro started life on February 3, 1986, a period of heightened socio-political upheaval and the cry for change and reform in the Philippines was at its peak. Initially formed by former members of the Adamson University Renaissance Universal Playhouse (AURUP), who wanted to create an independent theater group with its own form, artistry and aesthetics.

TNT stages plays with heavy undertone on change and challenging the current norms of the society. Some of its productions include Dwede Dwende (first official TNT production), Juan Tamban, Tibong Matiisin, Halimaw sa Pulo, Paglilitis ni Mang Serapio, Kalayaan 1896, Batang Pro, Bok, 20 Questions and a lot more, including original TNT playwright, have catapulted the organization as one of the most outstanding recognized student organizations of Adamson University. TNT recently once again captured the interest of the studentry and ADU Administration with the success of its 2014 fantasy ethnic inspired production ANITO written by Roland Madrigal and directed by Mark Anthony Legaspi, both TNT alumni.

National events
TNT has participated in various national events having been invited to perform in Cultural Center of the Philippines, Malacañang Palace for the Independence Youth Celebration of President Corazon C. Aquino in 1991, Kalakbay 1998 at the Nayong Pilipino, Movement Against Drug (MAD) launching at the Luneta Grandstand, South Manila Consortium Committee for the Arts. It has also toured locally in Bataan, Quezon Province, Ilocos and Davao serving invites from different schools to perform.

Cultural center
TNT is an affiliate of Cultural Center of the Philippines, National Commission for Culture and the Arts, PETA’s MTTL, Alyansa ng Mangagawang pang Kultura (ALYANSA) and NCR Association of University Theater Groups.

Some of its notable alumni includes Eduardo Alcalde - (member of Fr. Reuter Theater Ensemble) seasoned stage director and team building facilitator, Dexter Dominguez (a.k.a. Teri Onor) - politician, movie and TV impersonator/actor, Angelito Pangilinan (a.k.a. Angel Gomez) - Asian Flamenco Master, Mark Anthony Legaspi - stage director, movie and TV production manager/art director, Armand Samonte - independent film director/production manager, Cindy Liper - Aliw Awards best actress nominee for musical theater, Patrick Libao - Aliw Awards best actor nominee for musical theater, Noel Urbano and Gino Alcoba - professional dubber for ABS-CBN, GMA 7 and known Korean and Spanish telenovelas, and have produced professional actors and actress for known professional theater groups like Yuri del Rosario (Gantimpala Foundation), Jerome Laurel (The Library), Jerold Igharas (The Arts), Adel Arguel (The Arts), De’Rotsen Etolle (Phil. Stagers).

TNT also participates in the curricular and academic activities of Adamson University, fulfilling its commitment to be relevant and active in the campus. Today, Tinik ng Teatro is gearing for the biggest and grandest homecoming celebration for its 30th Pearl Anniversary come February 2016.

References

External links
http://www.tinikngteatro.multiply.com

Theater companies in Metro Manila